Peter Conrad (born 1948) is an Australian-born academic specialising in English literature, who taught at Christ Church at the University of Oxford. He is a fellow of the Royal Society of Literature.

Conrad was born in Hobart, Tasmania, and attended Hobart High School. After graduating from the University of Tasmania in 1968, Conrad went to Oxford University, UK, on a Rhodes Scholarship, studying at New College. He became a fellow of All Souls College from 1970 to 1973 before taking up his current post at Christ Church. There he taught English from 1973, and has been a visiting professor at Princeton University and at Williams College, and a guest lecturer throughout the United States.  By 2018 he had retired.

His criticism includes a major history of English literature, The Everyman History of English Literature, a cultural history of the twentieth century, two autobiographical works and a novel. He has written books of criticism on Orson Welles and Alfred Hitchcock and has been a prolific writer of features and reviews for many magazines and newspapers including The New York Times, The New Yorker, The Observer, the New Statesman, and The Monthly.

Reviewing J. R. R. Tolkien's The Silmarillion in the New Statesman, Conrad stated that "Tolkien can't actually write".

A review by Richard Poirier of Conrad's 1980 book, Imagining America, in the London Review of Books found it so slipshod, with such fundamental and pointedly homophobic misunderstandings Oscar Wilde, Rupert Brooke and W. H. Auden, that the reviewer wondered how it made it into print.

Bibliography

 
 Romantic Opera and Literary Form, Berkeley & Los Angeles: University of California Press, 1978, 
 Shandyism: The Character of Romantic Irony, Oxford: Basil Blackwell, 1978, 
 Imagining America, New York: Oxford University Press, 1980, 
 Television: The Medium and its Manners, Boston: Routledge & Kegan Paul, 1982, 
 The Art of the City: Views and Versions of New York, New York: Oxford University Press, 1984, 
 The Everyman History of English Literature, London: J. M. Dent, 1985, 
 A Song of Love and Death: The Meaning of Opera, New York: Poseidon Press, 1987, 
 Behind the Mountain: Return to Tasmania, London: Chatto & Windus, 1988, 
 Where I Fell to Earth: A Life in Four Cities, New York: Poseidon Press, 1990, 
 Underworld, Simon & Schuster, 1992, 
 Modern Times, Modern Places: Life and Art in the Twentieth Century, Thames & Hudson, 1999, 
 
 The Hitchock Murders, Faber & Faber, 2002, 
 At Home in Australia, Thames & Hudson, 2003, 
 Orson Welles: The Stories of His Life, Faber & Faber, 2004, 
 Creation: Artists, Gods & Origins, Thames & Hudson, 2007, 
 
 Verdi and/or Wagner: Two Men, Two Worlds, Two Centuries, Thames & Hudson, 2014, 
 Mythomania: Tales of Our Times, Thames & Hudson, 2016, 
 Shakespeare: The Theatre of Our World, Head of Zeus, 2018, 
 The Mysteries of Cinema: Movies and Imagination, Thames & Hudson, 2021,

References

External links 
Faber & Faber's biography
"Newsreel History" by Terry Eagleton: Review of Modern Times, Modern Places.
"Tales of Two Hemispheres" – Peter Conrad, Boyer Lectures, 2004, Australian Broadcasting Corporation
Peter Conrad, The Guardian

1948 births
Living people
Alumni of New College, Oxford
Australian Rhodes Scholars
Fellows of All Souls College, Oxford
Fellows of Christ Church, Oxford
Granta people
People from Hobart
University of Tasmania alumni